Ashland/63rd is an 'L' station and the terminal of the CTA Green Line's Ashland branch, located in the West Englewood neighborhood of Chicago, Illinois. Situating at 6315 S. Ashland Avenue, the station contains a Park 'n' ride lot with 235 spaces as well as a Kiss 'n' Ride lane. This is one of two stations on the Green Line to be named Ashland. The other station is on the Lake Street branch and is shared between the Green and Pink Lines. The Red Line served this station from May 19, 2013 to October 20, 2013, April 3, 2017 to November 22, 2017, and July 30, 2018 to April 26, 2019.

History

Loomis

Loomis was a station on the Englewood branch of the Chicago "L". Although other stations on the Englewood branch opened in stages, the station opened on July 13, 1907, concluding overall construction of the branch. Despite improvements to the station, it was closed in 1969 when the new Ashland/63rd station opened two blocks west.

Ashland/63rd
The Ashland/63rd station opened on May 6, 1969 to replace the Loomis station. Though the station itself was not rebuilt during the course of the Green Line renovation in 1994-96, an elevator was added to the station to make it ADA accessible.

Bus connections

CTA
 9 Ashland (Owl Service) 
 X9 Ashland Express (Weekday Rush Hours only)  
 63 63rd  (Owl Service)

Image gallery

See also
Ashland (CTA Green and Pink Lines station)
Ashland (CTA Orange Line station)
Ashland Yard

References

References

External links

Ashland/63rd Station Page at Chicago-L.org
Ashland Avenue entrance from Google Maps Street View

CTA Green Line stations
Chicago "L" terminal stations
Railway stations in the United States opened in 1969